Namugongo is a township in the Central Region of Uganda.

Location
The township is bordered by Nsasa to the north, Sonde and Bukeerere to the east, Bweyogerere to the south-east, Naalya and Kireka directly to the south, Kyaliwajjala to the south-west, and central Kira to the west and north-west. The coordinates of Namugongo are 0°23'43.0"N, 32°39'57.0"E (Latitude:0.395289; Longitude: 32.665835).

Uganda Martyrs
On 3 June 1886, 32 young men, pages of the court of King Mwanga II of Buganda, were burned to death at Namugongo for their refusal to renounce Christianity. They were Anglican and Catholic. Annually on 3 June, Christians from Uganda and other parts of the world congregate at Namugongo to commemorate the lives and religious beliefs of the Uganda Martyrs. Crowds have been estimated in hundreds of thousands in some years. In June 2015, an estimated 2 million people attended the event.

The Namugongo Shrines were first recognised by Joshua Serufusa-Zake (1884–25 June 1985) when he was the Sabaddu of Kira Sub-County. He constructed a structure at the Namugongo site, where it appears shrines were built later for prayer.

His interest in Christianity was enhanced by his father's participation in the wars that brought Christianity to Uganda. His father, Semei Musoke Seruma Katiginya, had earned a name for brevity "Ngubu" from the wars.

Churches are in areas where martyrs were killed, and they are also honored on churches' murals and stain glasses. The most prominent shrine is Namugongo which is located where St. Charles Lwanga and his companions were burned. The Ugandan tradition of honoring martyrs is important because Ugandans are honoring their pre-Christian heritage of spirituality and ancestry. The martyr's feast happens on June 3, and there are about half a million people who participate in the feast annually, and the day of the feast is a national holiday. Many pilgrims come from Kenya, Rwanda, Tanzania, and all over Uganda to take part in the Ugandan Martyr's Feast Day at Namugongo, and many others follow the celebration on national television.

Canonization
Twenty-two of the Catholic martyrs were canonized by Pope Paul VI on 18 October 1964 and are regarded as saints in the Catholic Church. A basilica has been built at the spot where the majority of them were burned to death. A church stands at the place where the Anglican martyrs met their death, about  further east from the Basilica of the Uganda Martyrs. Documentation is available on 45 martyrs but it is believed that many more believers met their death at the command of Kabaka Mwanga II between 1885 and 1887.

Uganda Martyrs' Secondary School
Namugongo is the location of the Uganda Martyrs' Secondary School, one of Uganda's leading high schools. The mixed boarding school is a partner with the Stephen Shames Foundation, based in Brooklyn, New York, in the instruction of information technology methods and applications to high-school students in Uganda.

Points of interest
The following points of interest are found at Namugongo or near its boundaries:
 Basilica of the Uganda Martyrs: a place of worship affiliated with the Roman Catholic Church
 Anglican Uganda Martyrs Shrine: a place of worship affiliated with the Church of Uganda
 Uganda Martyrs Primary School: a public, mixed, elementary school (grades 1–7)
 Uganda Martyrs Senior Secondary School: a public, mixed, boarding high school (grades 8–13)
 Uganda Martyrs Nursery & Daycare Centre: an early education institution erected to commemorate 75 years since Namugongo's Roman Catholic Parish was established in 1935.

See also
 Roman Catholicism in Uganda

References

External links
  Uganda Martyrs Senior Secondary School, Namugongo
Uganda: Namugongo To Get Shs14 Billion (US$4.5 Million) Electricity Substation

Populated places in Central Region, Uganda
Cities in the Great Rift Valley
Kira Town